Paramorpha is a genus of moths in the Carposinidae family.

Species
Paramorpha aplegia (Turner, 1916)
Paramorpha aquilana Meyrick, 1881
Paramorpha aulata Meyrick, 1913
Paramorpha cylindrica Meyrick, 1922
Paramorpha eburneola Turner, 1926
Paramorpha glandulata Meyrick, 1922
Paramorpha hapalopis Meyrick, 1910
Paramorpha marginata (Philpott, 1931) (originally in Carposina)
=Paramorpha heptacentra Meyrick, 1931
Paramorpha injusta Meyrick, 1913
Paramorpha rhachias Meyrick, 1910
Paramorpha semotheta Meyrick, 1910
Paramorpha tenuistria Turner, 1947

Former species
Paramorpha perileuca Lower, 1908

References

Natural History Museum Lepidoptera generic names catalog

Carposinidae